Des Harlock (20 December 1922 – 6 April 1981) was a Welsh footballer who played as an outside right for Liverpool, Tranmere Rovers, Stafford Rangers and Macclesfield Town. He made 158 appearances for Tranmere, scoring 18 goals.

References

1922 births
1981 deaths
People from Blaenau Ffestiniog
Sportspeople from Gwynedd
Association football wingers
Welsh footballers
Liverpool F.C. players
Tranmere Rovers F.C. players
Stafford Rangers F.C. players
English Football League players